The Occult: A History is a 1971 nonfiction occult book by English writer, Colin Wilson. Topics covered include Aleister Crowley, George Gurdjieff, Helena Blavatsky, Kabbalah, primitive magic,  Franz Mesmer, Grigori Rasputin, Daniel Dunglas Home, Paracelsus, P. D. Ouspensky, William Blake, Giacomo Casanova, Heinrich Cornelius Agrippa, and various others.

Contents
The Occult: A History is divided into three sections. Part one is entitled "A Survey of the Subject" and covers topics such as "Magic-The Science of the Future". Part two is titled "A History of Magic" and covers occult in history. Part three is called "Man's Latent Powers" and deals with topics such as spiritual entities in the chapter "The Realm of Spirits".

Reception

Joyce Carol Oates reviewed the book, remarking that it was an "excellent idea" for a book and that it "is one of those rich, strange, perplexing, infinitely surprising works that repay many readings." The Robesonian commented that the book was "vast" and "extremely well researched". A reviewer for the Boca Raton News panned the book, saying that "[Wilson] expects this "Faculty X" to unite instinct and intelligence, but what this might achieve explicitly, eluded this reviewer throughout the book's 560 minutely-detailed pages." In his book Modern Occult Rhetoric Joshua Gunn acknowledged the book's popularity but criticized "Wilson's expressed agenda to prove the existence of psychic and astral forces" as an occasional annoyance that "detracts from the value of his scholarship". Kirkus Reviews praised the history portion of the book while criticizing the other two sections of the book as "the usual pretentious, polymorphous thinking of that paraclete/exegete on what he calls Faculty X".

External links

References

1971 non-fiction books
20th-century history books
History books about the occult
Occult books
Books by Colin Wilson